Hagudi is a small borough in Rapla Parish, Rapla County, Estonia. As of 2011 Census, the settlement's population was 311.

It has a railway station on the Tallinn - Viljandi railway line operated by Elron (rail transit).

Baltic German admiral and explorer Adam Johann von Krusenstern (1770–1846), was born in Hagudi manor.

References

External links
Rapla Parish 
Hagudi Educational Centre 
Hagudi Manor

Boroughs and small boroughs in Estonia
Kreis Harrien